"To Live and Die in L.A." is a single from the soundtrack of the same name by English new wave band Wang Chung. Released on 25 September 1985, the song peaked on the Billboard Hot 100 at No. 41.

Cash Box said that the song "melds its own synth dance fusion with a clear cut pop sensibility which is alluring and ultimately triumphant" and that it captures "the city’s sense of 'loneliness within a maze of people.'" 

On the To Live and Die in L.A. DVD audio commentary, director William Friedkin stated to Wang Chung that he "didn’t want a theme song for To Live and Die in L.A." One day, though, Jack Hues and Nick Feldman gave Friedkin a copy of "To Live and Die in L.A." (to his dismay). Surprisingly, Friedkin was impressed and decided to keep the song as part of the film and soundtrack.

The album version includes additional lyrics not included in the single version.

Charts

References

External links
 

1985 singles
1985 songs
Wang Chung (band) songs
Songs written by Jack Hues
Songs written by Nick Feldman
Song recordings produced by Jolley & Swain
Geffen Records singles